Svibno is a settlement in the Municipality of Radeče in eastern Slovenia. The area is part of the historical region of Lower Carniola. The municipality is now included in the Lower Sava Statistical Region; until January 2014 it was part of the Savinja Statistical Region. It includes the hamlets of Malarija, Cumer, Pristava, Rasberg, and Podlog.

The local parish church is dedicated to the Holy Cross and belongs to the Roman Catholic Archdiocese of Ljubljana. Its earliest phases date to the 13th century, but it was rebuilt and restyled over the centuries.

References

External links

Svibno at Geopedia

Populated places in the Municipality of Radeče